Harold Lewis "Hal" Tysinger (19172005) was a World War II veteran of the U.S. Navy and attained the rank of Lieutenant Commander.   After the war, he was a photographer and Boy Scout leader.

Life
Harold was born on October 9, 1917, in Salisbury, Rowan County, North Carolina.  He was the son of Donald S. and Mary Lou Everhart Tysinger.  Hal was a World War II veteran of the United States Navy, serving in the Atlantic, Mediterranean, and Pacific theaters and rising to the rank of Lt. Commander.  He commanded the tanker Guardoqui, which carried fuel and lube oil from Pearl Harbor to Einewitok and then to Tokyo in 1945.

After the war Hal returned to his native North Carolina and pursued a career as a photographer.  He lived in Sanford, Lee County, North Carolina.

He died on March 28, 2005, in Moore County, North Carolina.

References

 Herald-Sun Newspaper, Durham, North Carolina, Obituaries, March 29, 2005, quoted in Genealogy
 

1917 births
2005 deaths
United States Navy personnel of World War II
United States Navy sailors
People from Salisbury, North Carolina
People from Lee County, North Carolina